is a brackish lake located between Tottori and Shimane prefectures in Japan. The lake is enclosed by the Shimane Peninsula to the north and Yumigahama Peninsula to the east. It is the fifth largest lake in surface area in Japan.

Nakaumi connects Lake Shinji (宍道湖 Shinji-ko) and the Sea of Japan, and is surrounded by the municipalities Matsue, Yasugi, Yonago and Sakaiminato.

There are two large islands in the lake, Daikon Island (大根島 Daikonjima, literally "radish island") and Eshima Island (江島 Eshima, "inlet island"). There are bridges (like the Eshima Ohashi Bridge) and roads that connect the east and west shores of the lake through the two islands.

Nakaumi is a brackish lake because it is connected to the Sea of Japan by a short channel, the Sakai Channel, and lies so low that the tides reverse the flow of the rivers all the way into Lake Shinji.

Nakaumi (中海) literally means "middle sea". Even though Nakaumi is a lake, it was likely named a sea because of its saline water and proximity to the actual sea. In Japanese, the lake is usually referred to simply as Nakaumi, not as Nakaumi-ko (Lake Nakaumi).

See also

List of lakes in Japan

References

Lakes of Japan
Ramsar sites in Japan
Landforms of Tottori Prefecture
Landforms of Shimane Prefecture